Time Stream is a jazz trio album recorded by pianist Toshiko Akiyoshi in New York in 1984.  It was released on the Toshiba East World record label.  This album is not to be confused with the 1996 Nippon Crown release, Time Stream: Toshiko Plays Toshiko.

Track listing
LP side A
"Prosperity" (Akiyoshi) – 5:09
"Con Alma" (Gillespie) – 6:20
"Giant Steps" (Coltrane) – 6:22
LP side B
"Smile" (Chaplin, Turner, Parsons) – 6:26
"Time Stream" (Akiyoshi) – 6:31
"Tico Tico" (de Abreu, Oliveira, Drake) – 5:29

Personnel
Toshiko Akiyoshi – piano
George Mraz – bass
Arthur Taylor – drums

References / external links
 Toshiba East World EWJ-90034, Toshiba East World TOCT-9732

Toshiko Akiyoshi albums
1984 albums